The 1993 Southern Conference baseball tournament was held at College Park in Charleston, South Carolina, from April 28 through May 1. Second seeded  won the tournament and earned the Southern Conference's automatic bid to the 1993 NCAA Division I baseball tournament. It was the Catamounts seventh tournament win.

The tournament used a double-elimination format. Only the top eight teams participate, so Furman was not in the field.

Seeding 
The top eight finishers in the league were seeded based on regular season conference winning percentage only. There were no ties in the standings, so no tiebreakers were needed.

Bracket

All-Tournament Team

References 

Tournament
Southern Conference Baseball Tournament
Southern Conference baseball tournament
Southern Conference baseball tournament
Southern Conference baseball tournament